Asapharcha is a genus of moths in the family Gelechiidae.

Species
 Asapharcha crateropa Meyrick, 1930
 Asapharcha strigifera Meyrick, 1920

References

Gelechiinae
Taxa named by Edward Meyrick
Moth genera